Shariq Us Sabah   (born 1993) is an Indian author, and poet primarily writing mainstream romance. His debut book was The Subdued Sound published by the Rochak Publishers. He released his second poetry book Manifesto of a Lover in 2014, published by Cyberwit Publishers. Lately he has been contributing to several newspapers and magazines as a columnist on various subjects specially related with recent developments in India.

Biography
Shariq is the only son to his parents and was born and raised in New Delhi. A student of Delhi Public School, Noida, Shariq moved to Symbiosis School of Economics to pursue under graduation studies.

Shariq is active on clubhouse and regularly doing rooms on various issues in India.

Works
While at Symbiosis School of Economics, Shariq started working on his debut book and eventually published it in 2013. The book was titled The Subdued Sound.

Shariq's second book, titled Manifesto Of a Lover, was released on 24 March 2014.

Awards
 Shariq is a recipient of Best Seller Poetry for The Subdued Sound
 Shariq is a recipient of "Literary Promise Award" for The Subdued Sound

References

https://countercurrents.org/author/shariq-us-sabah
https://sabrangindia.in/content-authors/shariq-us-sabah
https://qrius.com/author/shariq-us-sabah
https://kashmirobserver.net/2020/05/08/stimulus-package-for-post-lockdown-life
https://cjp.org.in/sedition-law-crushing-dissent-in-india-since-1833
http://www.kashmirtimes.com/newsdet.aspx?q=98406

English-language writers from India
Indian male novelists
Indian romantic fiction writers
Living people
1993 births